John Alexander Caldwell (April 21, 1852 – May 24, 1927) was a U.S. Representative from Ohio from 1889 to 1894. He also served as the 25th lieutenant governor of Ohio from 1900 to 1902.

Biography 
Born in Fairhaven, Ohio, Caldwell was educated in the common schools of his native county and also by private teachers.
He taught school for several years.
He was graduated from the Cincinnati Law School in 1876.
He was admitted to the bar the same year.
He again engaged in teaching.
He commenced the practice of law in Cincinnati, Ohio, in 1878.
He served as prosecuting attorney of the Cincinnati police court 1881–1885.

Caldwell was elected judge of the city police court in 1887.

Caldwell was elected president of the Ohio League of Republican Clubs in 1887.

Caldwell was elected as a Republican to the Fifty-first, Fifty-second, and Fifty-third Congresses and served from March 4, 1889, until May 4, 1894, when he resigned.
He served as mayor of Cincinnati from 1894 to 1897 and as the lieutenant governor of Ohio from 1900 to 1902.

Caldwell was elected judge of the court of common pleas in 1902, and served until his death in Cincinnati, Ohio, May 24, 1927.

He was interred in Spring Grove Cemetery.

Sources

Lieutenant Governors of Ohio
1852 births
1927 deaths
University of Cincinnati College of Law alumni
Republican Party members of the United States House of Representatives from Ohio
Politicians from Cincinnati
Ohio lawyers
People from Preble County, Ohio
Burials at Spring Grove Cemetery
19th-century American lawyers